Bir el Ater is a city located in far eastern Algeria. It is located towards the border with Tunisia, around 87 kilometers south of Tebessa and just beyond the Sahara. The town has a population of approximately 80,000 inhabitants.

Bir el Ater is the type site of the Paleolithic Aterian industry. The term Aterian derives from el-Ater. This lithic culture lasted between 40000 – 20000 years BC.

It is now a mining city, located 15 km south of Bir El Ater. There are deposits of Djebel Onk Phosphates, the largest in Algeria which are extracted and shipped by train to Annaba a port, 300 km north on the Mediterranean or are used locally.

Geography
To the north of Bir el-Ater is a plain.  Agriculture was flourishing at the time of the Romans.  Nowadays, the soil is dry and not very fertile.  Vegetation consists essentially of tufts of alfa.  To the south lies the Jebel Onk, north-east south-west, it is home to phosphates mines.

The landscape becomes more rugged with few peaks and wadis including many canyons in the yellow ocher.  Continuing towards Negrine, the vegetation becomes increasingly rare and the ground is made of white clay and pebbles.

History

Prehistoric
Early hominoid fossils have been found here.
Further, Bir El Ater is the archaeological site which gave its name to the Aterian culture of North Africa which corresponds roughly to the late Middle Paleolithic and early Upper Paleolithic (40 000 30 000 yearsBC, even up to 20 000 years BP in the Sahara).

Antiquity
The former wealth of this area is attested by many Roman wells and a few villas.  These remains are listed on the staff maps.  The wells are all dried up today.  A few kilometers north of Bir el-Ater are the ruins of a large Roman oil mill, preserved on two floors. The name of the village in antiquity was Vicus Aterii indicating only a small settlement, though it was the seat of an ancient Christian bishopric in the Roman province of  Byzacena. The ancient Bishopric survives today as a titular see of the Roman Catholic Church called Vicus Aterii. and the bishop until his death was Franz Vorrath of Germany.

References

Archaeological sites in Algeria
Communes of Tébessa Province
Algeria